The third season of Dragon Ball Z anime series contains the Frieza arc, which comprises Part 2 of the Frieza Saga. The episodes are produced by Toei Animation, and are based on the final 26 volumes of the Dragon Ball manga series by Akira Toriyama. 

The 33-episode season originally ran from January to September 1991 in Japan on Fuji Television. The first English airing of the series was on Cartoon Network where Funimation Entertainment dub of the series ran from September to November 1999.

Funimation released the season in a box set, and in June 2009, announced that they would be re-releasing Dragon Ball Z in a new seven volume set called the "Dragon Boxes". Based on the original series masters with frame-by-frame restoration, and is uncut. The first set was released November 10, 2009.


Episode list

References

1991 Japanese television seasons
Z (season 3)